Olga Szabó-Orbán ( Orbán, 9 October 1938 – 5 January 2022) was a Romanian foil fencer, world champion in 1962, and team world champion in 1969. A five-time Olympian, she won an individual silver medal in 1956 and team bronze medals in 1968 and 1972.

Career
Orbán was born into a Hungarian minority in Transylvania. She took up fencing at the relatively late age of 14 after her teacher Ecaterina Bartoș led the whole class to the fencing hall, where her husband Tibor was a coach. Her talent became rapidly apparent and she was placed under the responsibility of coach Ludovic Ozoray at club Progresul Cluj. She won in 1954 her first national championship in the junior category, followed in 1955 by a title in the senior category.

At the 1956 Olympics she earned a silver medal, the first Olympic medal in fencing for Romania. The gold medal went to Great Britain's Gillian Sheen, whom Orbán had beaten twice during the event. In 1961 Orbán won with Maria Vicol, Ana Pascu and Ecaterina Orb-Lazăr Romania's first medal at the World Fencing Championships with a team bronze medal, followed in 1962 by an individual gold medal. 
After retiring from competitions Orbán became a fencing coach at her club CSA Steaua. In 1990 she moved to Hungary with her husband, Olympic water polo player Alexandru Szabó, and later worked at the Budapest Honvéd sport club.

Personal life and death
Olga Szabó-Orbán died in January 2022, at the age of 83.

References

External links
 

1938 births
2022 deaths
Romanian female fencers
Romanian foil fencers
Olympic fencers of Romania
Fencers at the 1956 Summer Olympics
Fencers at the 1960 Summer Olympics
Fencers at the 1964 Summer Olympics
Fencers at the 1968 Summer Olympics
Fencers at the 1972 Summer Olympics
Olympic silver medalists for Romania
Olympic bronze medalists for Romania
Sportspeople from Cluj-Napoca
Romanian sportspeople of Hungarian descent
Olympic medalists in fencing
Medalists at the 1956 Summer Olympics
Medalists at the 1968 Summer Olympics
Medalists at the 1972 Summer Olympics
Universiade medalists in fencing
Universiade silver medalists for Romania